Night Key is a science fiction crime film starring Boris Karloff and released by Universal Pictures in 1937.

Plot
The inventor of a burglar alarm (Karloff) attempts to get back at the man who stole the profits to his invention (Hinds) before he goes blind. The device is then subverted by gangsters (Baxter, et al.) who apply pressure to the inventor and use his device to facilitate burglaries.

Cast
 Boris Karloff - David Mallory (billed as  Boris Karloff)
 Warren Hull - Jimmy Travis (billed as J. Warren Hull)
 Jean Rogers - Joan Mallory
 Alan Baxter - "The Kid"
 Samuel S. Hinds - Stephen Ranger (billed as Samuel Hinds)
 Hobart Cavanaugh - "Petty Louie"
 David Oliver - "Mike"
 Ward Bond - "Fingers"
 Frank Reicher - Carl
 Edwin Maxwell - Kruger

Production
Filming began on January 18, 1937, with a budget of $175,000. Filming ended on either February 16 or February 20, 6 days over schedule and $17,000 over budget.

This was the last film in which Boris Karloff was billed by only his last name, a policy that Universal had begun with The Old Dark House in 1932 and had continued for eight films across six years during the height of Karloff's career.

Home video release
This film, along with Tower of London, The Climax, The Strange Door and The Black Castle, was released on DVD in 2006 by Universal Studios as part of The Boris Karloff Collection.

This DVD set contains the rerelease version of this film from Realart Pictures, Inc. It also contains the rerelease version of the theatrical trailer

The packaging for this DVD set erroneously indicates that this film has a running time of 78 minutes.

See also
 1937 in science fiction
 Boris Karloff filmography

References

External links

1937 films
1930s crime films
1930s science fiction films
Universal Pictures films
American black-and-white films
Films directed by Lloyd Corrigan
American crime films
American science fiction films
Burglary in film
1930s English-language films
1930s American films
Science fiction crime films